Mogudu Kaavali ( Need Husband) is a 1980 Telugu-language film starring Chiranjeevi.

Plot
Krishna (Gayatri) has inherited much wealth from her father, but he imposed a condition that she should marry in order to inherit that wealth. Krishna doesn't want to marry a prince who might later turn out to be a toad, especially after seeing her friend Shanthi's marital life experience. But, she needs her father's wealth. So, she hires Chiru as her hired husband and tries to get her father's wealth. But, to her surprise and shock, Chiru turns out to be far more than she had bargained for! How Chiru transforms her forms the rest of the story.

Cast
 Chiranjeevi as Chiru
 Gayatri as Krishnaveni
 Nutan Prasad as Sundaram
 J. V. Ramana Murthi as Sankaram
 S. Varalakshmi as Parvati
 Suvarna as Santhi

Crew
 Story: Raja Navathe
 Dialogues: Satyanand
 Lyrics: Veturi
 Playback Singers: P. Susheela, S.P. Balasubrahmanyam and S.P. Sailaja
 Stills: K. Satyanarayana
 Stunts: Bhoomanand
 Press Relations: Vemuri Satyanarayana
 Publicity Designs: Gangadhar
 Assistant Directors: K. Ranga Rao, B.S. Reddy and Kolli Bapi Reddy
 Associate Director: Ravindranath
 Operative Cameraman: Vishnu Murthy and Harinarayana
 Dances: Tara
 Art: B. Prakash Rao
 Editor: Adurthi Harinath
 Cinematography: P. Chengaiah
 Music: J. V. Raghavulu
 Producer: Thammareddy V.K.
 Screenplay & Direction: Katta Subba Rao

Production Companies
 Production Company: Charitha Chitra
 Recording: Vijaya Gardens and AVM Studios
 Re-recording: Murugan Movietone
 Publicity: Sri Publicities
 Radio Publicity: Sri Prabhakar Advertisers
 Studios: Annapoorna Studios, Bhagyanagar Studios
 Outdoor Unit: Chakravarthy Chitra, Ramakrishna Studios and Bhagyanagar Studios
 Film Processing: Gemini Color Laboratories

Distributors
 Andhra: Lakshmi Chitra
 Nizam : Sri Dwaraka Tirumala
 Ceded: VMC Pictures

Soundtrack
All songs were written by Veturi Sundararama Murthy.

"Aadapillaki Eedoste"
"Aakasamlo Tarakalu"
"Naa Manase Madhurapuram"
"O Chilaka Paluke"
"Saachi Kodite"
"Sannajaji Sanditlo"

External links
 

1980 films
Films scored by J. V. Raghavulu
1980s Telugu-language films
Telugu remakes of Hindi films